Type locality, also called type area, is the locality where a particular rock type, stratigraphic unit or mineral species is first identified. If the stratigraphic unit in a locality is layered, it is called a stratotype, whereas the standard of reference for unlayered rocks is the type locality.

The term is similar to the term type site in archaeology or the term type specimen in biology.

Examples of geological type localities

Rocks and minerals 
 Aragonite: Molina de Aragón, Guadalajara, Spain
 Autunite: Autun, France
 Benmoreite: Ben More (Mull), Scotland
 Blairmorite: Blairmore, Alberta, Canada
 Boninite: Bonin Islands, Japan
 Comendite: Comende, San Pietro Island, Sardinia
 Cummingtonite: Cummington, Massachusetts
 Dunite: Dun Mountain, New Zealand.
 Essexite: Essex County, Massachusetts, US
 Fayalite: Horta, Fayal Island, Azores, Portugal
 Harzburgite: Bad Harzburg, Germany
 Icelandite: Thingmuli (Þingmúli), Iceland
 Ijolite: Iivaara, Kuusamo, Finland
 Kimberlite: Kimberley, Northern Cape, South Africa
 Komatiite: Komati River, South Africa
 Labradorite: Paul's Island, Labrador, Canada
 Lherzolite: Étang de Lers, France (Old spelling was: Étang de Lherz.)
 Mimetite: Treue Freundschaft Mine, Johanngeorgenstadt, Germany
 Mugearite: Mugeary, Skye, Scotland
 Mullite: Isle of Mull, Scotland
 Pantellerite: Pantelleria, off Sicily
 Portlandite: Scawt Hill, Ballygalley, Larne, County Antrim, Northern Ireland
 Rodingite: Roding River, New Zealand
 Sovite: Norsjø, Norway
 Strontianite: Strontian, Scotland (also the element strontium derived from the mineral)
 Temagamite: Copperfields Mine, Temagami, Ontario, Canada
 Tonalite: Tonale Pass
 Trondhjemite: Follstad, Støren, Norway
 Uraninite: Joachimsthal, Austria-Hungary (now Jáchymov, Czech Republic)
 Websterite: Webster in North Carolina.
 Widgiemoolthalite: Widgiemooltha, Western Australia, Australia
 Ytterbite (a.k.a. gadolinite): Ytterby, Sweden

Formations 
 Bearpaw Formation: Bear Paw Mountains, Montana, US
 Burgess Shale: Burgess Pass on Mount Burgess, Alberta–BC, Canada
 Calvert Formation: Calvert Cliffs State Park, Maryland, US
 Chapel Island Formation: Newfoundland, Canada
 Chattanooga Shale: Chattanooga, Tennessee, US
 Chazy Formation: Chazy, New York, US
 Fort Payne Formation: Fort Payne, Alabama, US
 Gault Formation: Copt Point, Folkestone, UK 
 Holston Formation: Holston River, Tennessee, US
 Jacobsville Sandstone: Jacobsville, Michigan, US
 Ogallala Formation: High Plains, US
 St. Louis Limestone: St. Louis, Missouri, US
 Ste. Genevieve Limestone: Ste. Genevieve, Missouri, US
 Temple Butte Formation: Temple Butte, Grand Canyon, US
 Upper Greensand Formation: Weald, Sussex, Hampshire
 Waulsortian mudmound: Waulsort, Namur, Belgium

See also
 Global Boundary Stratotype Section and Point

References

 
Stratigraphy